There are three mountains named Mount Brew in British Columbia:

Mount Brew (Lillooet Ranges) - just S of Lillooet
Mount Brew (Cariboo Mountains) - just N of Quesnel Lake
Mount Brew (Cheakamus River) - near Whistler/Squamish